Mamamoo, sometimes stylized as MAMAMOO, is a South Korean girl group formed by Rainbow Bridge World (formerly WA Entertainment) in 2014. The group officially debuted on June 18, 2014 with the song "Mr. Ambiguous". Their debut was considered by some critics as one of the best K-pop debuts of 2014. They are recognized for their retro, jazz, and R&B concepts and strong vocal performances.

Released songs

See also
 List of songs written by Moonbyul

References

Mamamoo